Ballari, officially Bellary, in the eponymous Ballari district, is a city in the state of Karnataka, India.

History

Ballari was a part of Rayalaseema (Ceded Districts) which was part of Madras Presidency till 1 November 1956.

The Ballari city municipal council was upgraded to a city corporation in 2004.

The Union Ministry of Home Affairs of the Government of India approved a proposal to rename the city in October 2014 and Ballari was renamed to "Ballari" on 1 November 2014.

Geography

The city stands in the midst of a wide, level plain of black cotton soil.
Granite rocks and hills form a prominent feature of Ballari. The city is spread mainly around two hills of granite composition, the Ballari Hill and the Kumbara Gudda.

To the east and south lies an irregular heap of boulders, to the west there is an unbroken monolith, and the north is walled by bare, rugged ridges.

Kumbara Gudda looks like the profile of a human face from the south-east. It is also known as Face Hill.

Climate

Demographics

According to the 2011 Census of India, the urban population of Ballari was 410,445; of whom 206,149 were male and 204,296 female. 280,610 of the population were literate and 52,413 of the population were under 7 years of age. The population in 2001 was recorded as 316,766.

Languages
 

Both Kannada (36.25%) and Telugu (28.06%) are the predominant languages, Kannada is the official language,
Urdu (25.78%) is also widely spoken,
Whereas, Marwari  (3.01%),
Marathi  (1.82%),
Tamil  (1.74%),
Hindi  (1.23%),
Malayalam (1.08%) and
Others (1.03%) are also spoken in minority.

Economy

Industries

Textiles and garments
 Cotton processing
With cotton being one of the major agricultural crops around Ballari historically, the city has had a thriving cotton processing industry in the form of ginning, spinning and weaving plants.  The earliest steam cotton-spinning mill was established in 1894, which by 1901 had 17,800 spindles, and employed 520 hands.
The city continues to thrive in this sector with one spinning mill and numerous cotton ginning and pressing mills, hand looms and power looms.
 Garment manufacture
Ballari has a historic garment industry dating back to the First World War period, when the Marathi speaking "Darji" (tailor) community with its native skills in tailoring migrated from the current Maharashtra region to stitch uniforms for the soldiers of the colonial British Indian Army stationed at Ballari. After the war, the community switched to making uniforms for school children, and gradually the uniforms made here became popular all over the country.
Currently, Ballari is well known for its branded and unbranded denim garments, with brands like Point Blank, Walker, Dragonfly and Podium being successfully marketed nationally and internationally. There are about 260 denim garment units in Ballari with nearly 3000 families working in these units.

Notable people
See 

 Kolur Basavanagoud – Politician, Educationist, and Industrialist. He served as MP in 13th Lok Sabha from Ballari Lok Sabha constituency.
 Basavarajeshwari – Politician and Industrialist
 Ravi Belagere – Actor, writer, novelist, journalist, publisher of the Hai Bengaluru Tabloid
 Naveen Chandra – Actor in Telugu film industry
 Manjula Chellur −1st Woman Chief Justice of Calcutta High Court
 Nagarur Gopinath – One of the pioneers of cardiothoracic surgery in India, credited with the first successful performance of open heart surgery in India in 1962. Recipient of Padma Shri (1974) and Dr. B. C. Roy Award (1978)
 Jayanthi –  cinema actress, born in Ballari
 K. C. Kondaiah – Politician and industrialist
 Arcot Ranganatha Mudaliar – Former Deputy Collector of Ballari, politician and theosophist. He served as the Minister of Public Health and Excise for the Madras Presidency from 1926 to 1928.
 A. Sabhapathy Mudaliar – Philanthropist; The Women & Children's Hospital or The District Hospital was initially named after him, following his donation of land and building to the hospital.
 Bellary Raghava (1880–1946) – Noted dramatist.  The Raghava Kala Mandir auditorium in Ballari is named after him
 Suparna Rajaram – Distinguished Professor of Psychology at Stony Brook University
 Dharmavaram Ramakrishnamacharyulu (1853–1912) – Noted dramatist
 Bhargavi Rao – a  Kannada-Telugu translator, winner of the prestigious Kendra Sahitya Academy award
 Kolachalam Srinivasa Rao (1854–1919)  – Noted dramatist
 Gali Janardhan Reddy – Former minister and district in charge. He is one of the richest politicians in India
 B Sriramulu - Present Minister of Health and Family Welfare of Karnataka
 Tekur Subramanyam – Indian Freedom Fighter, First post-independence MP of Ballari, elected thrice in a row since 1952, political secretary to Prime Minister Jawaharlal Nehru
 Ibrahim B. Syed – Indo-American Radiologist
 Allum Veerabhadrappa - former minister, Government of Karnataka

References

Maps

General

External links

 Official website of Ballari City Corporation

 
1808 establishments in British India
Cities in Karnataka